The Silver Lion (also known as Silver Lion for Best Direction) is an annual award presented for best directing achievements in a feature film at official competition section of the Venice Film Festival since 1998. 

The prize has been awarded irregularly and has gone through several changes of purpose. Between 1953 and 1994, the award was given infrequently to a number of films as second prize for those nominated for the Golden Lion. At various times, the Silver Lion has also been awarded for debut films, short films, and direction.

Silver Lion for Best Direction (1990–present) 

{| class="wikitable sortable plainrowheaders"
|-
! scope="col" | Year
! scope="col" | Director(s)
! scope="col" | Film
! scope="col" | Original title
|-
| colspan="4" data-sort-value="ω" style="background-color:#EAECF0; font-weight:bold; padding-left:20%"| 1990s
|-
| style="text-align:center;"| 1990 
| 
| colspan="2"|   
|-
| style="text-align:center;"| 1998 
| 
|  
|   
|-
| style="text-align:center;"| 1999 
| 
| {{sort|Seventeen Years|Seventeen Years}}
|   
|-
| colspan="4" data-sort-value="ω" style="background-color:#EAECF0; font-weight:bold; padding-left:20%"| 2000s
|-
| style="text-align:center;"| 2000 
| 
|  
|  
|-
| style="text-align:center;"| 2001 
| 
| 
|  
|-
| style="text-align:center;"| 2002 
| 
| 
|   
|-
| style="text-align:center;"| 2003 
| 
|  
|   
|-
| style="text-align:center;"| 2004 
| 
| 
|   
|-
| style="text-align:center;"| 2005 
| 
| 
|  
|-
| style="text-align:center;"| 2006 
| 
| 
|   
|-
| style="text-align:center;"| 2007 
| 
| colspan="2"|   
|-
| style="text-align:center;"| 2008 
| 
| 
|   
|-
| style="text-align:center;"| 2009 
| 
| 
| 
|-
| colspan="4" data-sort-value="ω" style="background-color:#EAECF0; font-weight:bold; padding-left:20%"| 2010s
|-
| style="text-align:center;"| 2010 
| 
| 
|  
|-
| style="text-align:center;"| 2011 
| 
| 
|  
|-
| style="text-align:center;"| 2012 
| 
| colspan="2"|  
|-
| style="text-align:center;"| 2013 
| 
| colspan="2"|  
|-
| style="text-align:center;"| 2014 
| 
| 
|   
|-
| style="text-align:center;"| 2015 
| 
| 
|   
|-
| rowspan="2" style="text-align:center;"| 2016 
|  
| 
|   
|-
|  
| 
|   
|-
| style="text-align:center;"| 2017 
| 
| 
| 
|-
| style="text-align:center;"| 2018 
| 
| colspan="2"|  
|-
| style="text-align:center;"| 2019 
| 
| 
|   
|-
| colspan="4" data-sort-value="ω" style="background-color:#EAECF0; font-weight:bold; padding-left:20%"| 2020s
|-
| style="text-align:center;"| 2020 
| 
| 
| 
|-
| style="text-align:center;"| 2021 
| 
| colspan="2"|  
|-
| style="text-align:center;"| 2022 
| 
| colspan="2"|  
|-
|}

Multiple winners

The following received two Best Director awards:

 Defunct awards 
Silver Lion Prize (1953–1994)
From 1953 to 1957, the Silver Lion was awarded to a number of films nominated for the Golden Lion as a second prize. Since 1988, the Silver Lion has been given to one or more films nominated for the Golden Lion.
 1953
 Little Fugitive by Raymond Abrashkin, Morris Engel, and Ruth Orkin
 Moulin Rouge by John Huston
 Sadko by Aleksandr Ptushko
 Thérèse Raquin by Marcel Carné
 Ugetsu by Kenji Mizoguchi
 I Vitelloni by Federico Fellini
 1954
 On the Waterfront by Elia Kazan
 Sansho the Bailiff by Kenji Mizoguchi
 Seven Samurai by Akira Kurosawa
 La Strada by Federico Fellini
 1955
 Le Amiche by Michelangelo Antonioni
 The Big Knife by Robert Aldrich
 Ciske de Rat by Wolfgang Staudte
 The Grasshopper by Samson Samsonov
 1956 – no award
 1957 – Le Notti Bianche by Luchino Visconti
 1988 – Landscape in the Mist by Theo Angelopoulos
 1989
 Recordações da Casa Amarela by João César Monteiro
 Death of a Tea Master by Kei Kumai
 1990 – no award
 1991
 Raise the Red Lantern by Zhang Yimou
 The Fisher King by Terry Gilliam
 J'entends plus la guitare by Philippe Garrel
 1992
 Hotel de lux by Dan Pița
 Jamón Jamón by Bigas Luna
 Un cœur en hiver by Claude Sautet
 1993 – Kosh ba kosh by Bakhtyar Khudojnazarov
 1994
 Heavenly Creatures by Peter Jackson
 Little Odessa by James Gray
 Il toro by Carlo Mazzacurati

Silver Lion for Best First Work(1981–1982)
 1981 
 Do You Remember Dolly Bell? by Emir Kusturica
 1982
 Sciopèn by Luciano Odorisio
 The Hes Case (De smaak van water) by Orlow Seunke

Silver Lion for Best First Film (1983–1987)
 1983 – Sugar Cane Alley by Euzhan Palcy
 1984 – Sonatine by Micheline Lanctôt
 1985 – Dust by Marion Hänsel
 1986 – A King and His Movie by Carlos Sorín
 1987 – Maurice by James Ivory

Silver Lion for Best Screenplay (1990)
 1990 – Sirup by Helle Ryslinge

Silver Lion for Best Short Film (1996–2007)
 1996 – O Tamaiti by Sima Urale
 1999 – Portrait of a Young Man Drowning by Teboho Mahlatsi
 2000 – A Telephone Call for Genevieve Snow by Peter Long
 2001 – Freunde by Jan Krüger
 2002 – Clown by Irina Evteeva
 2003 – Neft by Murad Ibragimbekov
 2004 – Signe d'appartenance by Kamel Cherif
 2005 – Xiaozhan by Chien-ping Lin
 2006 – Comment on freine dans une descente? by Alix Delaporte
 2007 – Dog Altogether by Paddy Considine

Silver Lion for Revelation (2006)
 2006 – Emanuele Crialese for Nuovomondo''

References

External links
 La Biennale di Venezia official website

Venice Film Festival
 
Awards for best director
Italian film awards
Lists of films by award